Mika Karttunen (born 30 May 1981) is a Finnish chess player, International Master.

Chess career
He won the Finnish Championship in 2002, 2006, 2007, 2009, 2010, 2013 and 2014. Played for Finland in the Chess Olympiads of 2000, 2002, 2004, 2006, 2008,  2010 and 2012. He won individual silver medal on second board at European Chess Club Championship in Saint-Vincent, Italy (2005).

In January 2012 FIDE list, he has an Elo rating of 2441, making him Finland's number four.

Notable games
Mika Karttunen vs Malcolm Armstrong, EU Union Championships 2006, Trompowsky Attack (A45), 1-0
Mika Karttunen vs Sergei Movsesian, EU Clubs Cup (Men) 2003, Trompowsky Attack (A45), 1/2-1/2
Stuart Conquest vs Mika Karttunen, EU Union Championships 2006, Modern Defense, Bronstein Variation (E94), 0-1

References

External links

Mika Karttunen at 365Chess.com
Rating data for Mika Karttunen

1981 births
Living people
Finnish chess players
Chess International Masters
Chess Olympiad competitors